The 2009 Copa Libertadores de América (officially the 2009 Copa Santander Libertadores de América for sponsorship reasons) was the 50th edition of the Copa Libertadores de América, CONMEBOL's premier annual international club tournament.

The tournament was won by Argentine club Estudiantes de La Plata, who achieved their fourth Copa Libertadores title and first in 39 years. Since the inception of a preliminary round in 2004, they are the first club to start in that round and win the Copa Libertadores. Estudiantes earned a berth to play in 2010 Recopa Sudamericana and in the 2009 FIFA Club World Cup but lost both titles to LDU Quito and Barcelona respectively.

Qualified teams

Round and draw dates
The calendar shows the dates of the rounds and draw. All events occurred in 2009 unless otherwise stated.

Tie-breaking criteria
At each stage of the tournament teams receive 3 points for a win, 1 point for a draw, and no points for a loss. If two or more teams are equal on points, the following criteria will be applied to determine the rankings in the group stage:

superior goal difference;
higher number of goals scored;
higher number of away goals scored;
draw.

For the first stage, round of 16, quarterfinals, and semifinals, the fourth criterion is replaced by a penalty shootout if necessary. The finals have their own set of criteria; see the finals section for more details.

First stage

In the First Stage, twelve teams played a two-legged tie (one game at home and one game away) against another opponent. The winner of each tie advanced to the Second Stage. Team #1 played the second leg at home.

Second stage

A total of 26 teams qualified directly to this phase and were joined by six teams from the First Stage, bringing the total to 32 teams. The top two teams from each group advanced to the Third Stage.

Group 1

Group 2

Group 3

Group 4

Group 5

Group 6

Group 7

Group 8

Knockout stages

The last four stages of the tournament (round of 16, quarterfinals, semifinals, and finals) form a single-elimination tournament, commonly known as a knockout stage. Sixteen teams advanced into the first of these stages: the third stage.

Seeding
The 16 qualified teams were seeded according to their results in the Second Stage. The top teams from each group were seeded 1–8, with the team with the most points as seed 1 and the team with the least as seed 8. The second-best teams from each group were seeded 9–16, with the team with the most points as seed 9 and the team with the least as seed 16.

Bracket

Round of 16
The first match of the Round of 16 began on 5 May, with the last match played on 21 May. Team #1, as the higher seeded team, played the second leg at home.

Quarterfinals
Team #1, as the higher seeded team, played the second leg at home.

Semifinals
Team #1, as the higher seeded team, played the second leg at home.

Finals

Top goalscorers

Footnotes

A. Guadalajara and San Luis withdrew from the tournament following concerns raised by both Nacional and São Paulo over the H1N1 flu outbreak in Mexico, South American teams refused to travel to Mexico to play the match; no agreement was reached on alternative venues for the first-leg matches, both scheduled to be played in Mexico. Both Guadalajara and San Luis were later secured a place in the round of 16 for the 2010 Copa Libertadores.

References

General

External links
CONMEBOL's official website 

 
1
2009